Unterwellenborn is a municipality in the district Saalfeld-Rudolstadt, in Thuringia, Germany. It was created on 1 February 2006 by fusion of the municipalities , Goßwitz, Könitz, Lausnitz bei Pößneck and Unterwellenborn itself which had cooperated earlier as Verwaltungsgemeinschaft Unterwellenborn. Already on 9 April 1994, the municipalities Dorfkulm, Langenschade and Oberwellenborn had become part of the municipality of Unterwellenborn. In July 2018 the former municipality of Kamsdorf was merged into Unterwellenborn.

References

Municipalities in Thuringia
Saalfeld-Rudolstadt